Shamsabad (also Romanized as Shamsābād) is a village in Jajrud Rural District, in the Jajrud District of Pardis County, Tehran Province, Iran. At the 2006 census, its population was 78, in 28 families.

References 

Populated places in Pardis County